Raaghavan Murugan, also credited as Master Raghavan, is an Indian child actor who works in Tamil-Telugu language film. He has received positive reviews for his performance.

Career 
Raaghavan made his acting debut through the cop drama Sethupathi (2016) portraying the son of the character played by Vijay Sethupathi. The film won positive reviews, as did Raaghavan's performance, with a critic from Behindwoods.com noting that "the kids brim with pleasant innocence, and energetic performances". Further reviews from Sify.com and Indiaglitz.com noted that the "two kids who played as Vijay Sethupathi’s children are too good" and that Raghavan "has his own mass scene in the climax". His next film, Rekka (2016), saw Raaghavan play the younger version of Vijay Sethupathi's character. He garnered attention for his acting in the video for the song "Kannamma" for the film.

Raaghavan continued to play pivotal roles as a child artist in Tamil films in the late 2010s, often portraying the child of the film's lead character such as in Bhaskar Oru Rascal (2018) and Maari 2 (2018); or the younger version of the lead actor such as in Hero (2019), Vaanam Kottattum (2020) and Enemy (2021). He also appeared in the Telugu film, Uppena (2021), as the younger version of the protagonist.

In 2022, he appeared as the young version of Vikram's character in Mahaan, and shot for his scenes in Kanchipuram. Raaghavan will next be seen in Mani Ratnam's Ponniyin Selvan: I (2022), ponniyin selvan:2 (2023) portraying the Pandya prince.

Filmography

Films 
All films are Tamil unless otherwise noted.

Other roles
Pakkiri (2019; voice artist)

References

External links 

Living people
Child actors in Tamil cinema
21st-century Indian male child actors
Year of birth missing (living people)